Trycherus kinduensis is a species of beetle from the Endomychidae family. The scientific name of this species was first published in 1953 by Villiers.

References

Endomychidae